Pavel Nabokikh (born  in Moscow) is a Russian freestyle skier, specializing in halfpipe.

Nabokikh competed at the 2014 Winter Olympics for Russia. He placed 24th in the qualifying round in the halfpipe, failing to advance.

As of April 2014, his best showing at the World Championships is 22nd, in the 2013 halfpipe.

Nabokikh made his World Cup debut in January 2013. As of April 2014, his best World Cup finish is 17th, at Calgary in 2013–14. His best World Cup overall finish in halfpipe is 39th, in 2013–14.

References

1989 births
Living people
Olympic freestyle skiers of Russia
Freestyle skiers at the 2014 Winter Olympics
Skiers from Moscow
Russian male freestyle skiers